Alexandra Cardenas (born 1976) is a Colombian composer and improviser now based in Berlin, who has followed a path from Western classical composition to improvisation and live electronics. Her recent work has included live coding performance, including performances at the forefront of the Algorave scene, she also co-organised a live coding community in Mexico City. At the 2014 Kurukshetra Festival Cardenas was a keynote speaker and hosted a music live coding workshop, the first of its kind in India. Cardenas has been invited to talk about and perform live coding at events such as the Berlin based Transmediale festival and the Ableton sponsored Loop symposium, and held residencies including at Tokyo Wonder Site in Japan and Centre for the Arts in Mexico City.

She has been featured in videos by governmental broadcast agencies..

References

External links 
 http://cargocollective.com/tiemposdelruido - official webpage
 

Live coding
1976 births
Living people
Algorave